The Hells Mouth Grits, formally defined and renamed the Hells Mouth Formation by Young et al. (1994, p. 337), is a geological formation composed of Cambrian Greywackes in the south west part of St. Tudwal's Peninsula (which protrudes from the southern coast of the main Llŷn Peninsula, North West Wales). Equivalent to the Rhinog Formation in the Harlech Dome, the grit beds exposed at St Tudwal's are very uniform in lithology and thickness when traced along the outcrops, with a gradual thinning southwards. They exhibit the characteristic textures and structures of greywackes but differ from the normal type in being relatively well sorted and commonly laminated. Intercalated mudstones are more variable both in thickness and in lithology and contain laminated mudstones rich in sponge remains. The sandstones have sharply defined bases, often bearing sole structures and occasionally loaded. Sandstone dykes cut down from the bases of some beds and extend through up to 0.6 m of underlying siltstones. The sandstones may form sheets up to 4 m thick, although a bed thickness of up to 1m is more usual, and  have been interpreted as turbidites deposited by currents from the northeast (Bassett & Walton, 1960).

Type Section of the Hell's Mouth Formation is at Trwyn y Ffosle, 1 km north of Trwyn Careg-y-tir, where a relatively complete succession can be traced from sea-level to the manganese trials marking the line of outcrop of the overlying Trwyn y Fulfran Formation. The upper part of this section is not well exposed, so the section above Trwyn Carreg-y-tir has been used to define the base of the Trwyn y Fulfran Formation (Young et al., 1994, p. 337).

The Hells Mouth Formation has yielded fossils dating back to the Lower Cambrian period, including the trilobites Hamatolenus (Myopsolenus) douglasi Bassett et al. (1976, p. 627, pl.1, figs 1 - 8; pl. 2, figs. 1 - 4). Leptochilodiscus succinctus (described originally as Kerberodiscus succinctus gen. et sp. nov., Bassett et al., op. cit. p. 631, pl.2, figs. 6 - 14; pl. 3 figs. 1 - 4), and Serrodiscus ctenoa? Rushton, 1966, collected from 16.5 m below the base of the overlying Trwyn y Fulfran Formation at Trwyn Carreg-y-tir. The fauna is of late lower Cambrian age and falls within the upper part of the protolenid-strenuellid Zone  of the Comley Series of British nomenclature. East of Trwyn y Fossle acritarchs from the upper part of the Hell's Mouth Formation are often numerous but, at best, moderately well preserved (Young, et al., 1994, p. 338.).

See also

 List of fossiliferous stratigraphic units in Wales

References

 

Cambrian System of Europe
Cambrian Wales
Cambrian south paleopolar deposits